Team Quest is a mixed martial arts training camp founded by Randy Couture and Dan Henderson with facilities located in Gresham, Oregon; Murrieta, California;  Encinitas, California; Redding, California; Hemet, California; and Chiang Mai, Thailand. Notable fighters that have trained at the Oregon facility are Matt Lindland, Dave Jansen, Nathan Coy, and Chael Sonnen.

The Portland, Oregon location is led by Coach Matt Lindland, Olympic Silver Medalist, UFC veteran and former coach of the USA Olympic Wrestling Team. 

The California facility hosts teammates, former two division PRIDE & Strikeforce Light Heavyweight Champion Dan Henderson, as well as Rameau Thierry Sokoudjou, Krzysztof Soszynski, and Jesse Taylor. The majority of fighters at Team Quest come from a background in wrestling.

The Redding location in Northern California is headed by BJJ Black Belt Carlos Zapata and is home to Muay Thai Kru Josh Hernandez. The location was shutdown for undisclosed reasons.

Team Quest Portland's Pat Healy has spent time in China, helping MMA fighters and conducting training sessions with Legend's FC fighters. Healy has hosted some BJJ seminars in Hong Kong.

Notable members
 Heath Sims
 Sebastian Rodriguez 
 Sam Alvey
 Josh Burkman
 Ryo Chonan
 Nathan Coy
 Cyrille Diabaté
 Pat Healy
 Chris Leben
 Ryan Healy
 Dan Henderson - Last Pride Middleweight Champion, First, Last and Only Pride Welterweight Champion, 2006 Pride Welterweight Grand Prix Champion, Last Strikeforce Light Heavyweight Champion
 Ed Herman
 Dave Jansen
 Shaun Lethco - Was a top competitor he has his golden gloves and is a 2nd degree green belt in Muay Thai
 Frank Lester
 Matt Lindland - 2000 Olympic Wrestling Silver Medalist, UFC Middleweight Title Challenger
 Ian Loveland
 Vinny Magalhaes - 2007 World No-gi Jiu Jitsu Champ, 2011 ADCC +99 kg Champ
 Tyson Nam
 Yushin Okami - Former UFC Middleweight Title Challenger
 Mike Pierce
 Tarec Saffiedine - Last Strikeforce Welterweight Champion
 Fabiano Scherner
 Jay Silva
 Rameau Thierry Sokoudjou
 Chael Sonnen - Former 2-Time UFC Middleweight Title Challenger, UFC Light Heavyweight Title Challenger, WEC Middleweight Title Challenger
 Evan Tanner - Former UFC Middleweight Champion, Former UFC Light Heavyweight Title Challenger, First American to win Pancrase Neo-Blood Tournament (1998), Former USWF Heavyweight Champion (7 title defenses
 Jesse Taylor - The Ultimate Fighter 25 winner
 Christopher Thompson Jr
 Joe Warren - 2006 60 kg Greco-Roman Wrestling World Champion
 Daniel Weichel
 Nate Quarry - Former UFC Middleweight title challenger
 Jared Vanderaa - UFC Heavyweight Fighter, Owner of the Team Quest San Jacinto location
 feather Weight Enoch Wilson, 20-10-2, (Beaverton Oregon) he has the record for the most fights in the Moda center in Portland, he now owns his own team Animals MMA Fitness and Nutrition.

References

External links
Team Quest Portland
Team Quest Encinitas Gym
Team Quest Thailand Gym

Mixed martial arts training facilities
International Fight League
Gresham, Oregon
1999 establishments in the United States